Alonso Sánchez Coello ( 1531 – 8 August 1588) was an Iberian portrait painter of the Spanish and Portuguese Renaissance. He is mainly known for his portrait paintings executed in a style which combines the objectivity of the Flemish tradition with the sensuality of Venetian painting. He was court painter to Philip II.

Life 

Alonso Sánchez Coello was born in Benifairó de les Valls, near Valencia in Spain. He spent his childhood there until the death of his father when he was around ten years old. He left for Portugal c. 1541 or 1542 to live with his grandfather, who was then in the service of the Portuguese monarchs and had been raised to the Portuguese nobility.  Coello's years in Portugal and his family name of Portuguese origin led to a long-standing belief that he was in fact Portuguese. His grandfather's master King John III of Portugal sent the young painter to study with Anthonis Mor (also known as Antonio Moro) in Flanders around 1550.  He came under the protection of Antoine de Granville, bishop of Arras, who was also a patron of Mor.

In 1552, the painter went to Lisbon with Anthonis Mor when Charles V commissioned Mor to paint the Portuguese royal family. For a few years, Sánchez Coello remained in Portugal working for the court of the heir to the throne, João Manuel, Prince of Portugal. After the prince's death, Sánchez Coello moved to the Spanish court of Philip II, having been recommended by the widow of John, Juana, who was the sister of the Spanish king. In 1555, Sánchez Coello was in Valladolid working for the Spanish court.

Sánchez Coello became Court Painter in 1560. Sánchez Coello married Louisa Reyaltes, a daughter of a silversmith, in either 1560 or 1561 in Valladolid. The couple had seven children. Coello's daughter, Isabel Sánchez (1564–1612), became a painter. She studied and helped in her father's workshop. The painter moved with the court to Toledo and finally settled in Madrid in 1561. Coello worked on religious themes for most of the palaces, particularly for El Escorial, and larger churches. Philip II held him in high esteem and was godfather to two of his daughters. The painter spent the remainder of his life at the court, becoming a personal favourite of the king and acquiring honours and wealth.

Among his disciples  were Juan Pantoja de la Cruz and Felipe de Liaño. Lope de Vega praised Coello in his work Laurel to Apolo. Alonso Sánchez Coello died in Madrid on 8 August 1588.

Work
While Coello produced both portraits and religious paintings, it is for his portraits that he is chiefly remembered. They are marked by an ease of pose and execution, a dignity and sobriety of representation, and warmth of colouring. Although influenced by the paintings of both Mor and Titian, these portraits display an original talent and reflect admirably the modesty and formality of the Spanish court. Paintings of Philip II (c. 1580) and Infanta Isabel Clara Eugenia (1571), both in the Prado, Madrid, are two of his finest works. Sánchez Coello also produced a touching series of paintings of the children of Philip II. The extreme delicacy of the children's portrait softens the rigid etiquette and fashion of the court. The double portrait of the Infantas Isabella Clara Eugenia and Catalina Micaela (1568–9; Madrid, Convent of Las Descalzas Reales) is an example. 

Coello was a follower of Titian, and, like him, excelled in portraits and single figures, elaborating the textures of his armours, draperies, and such accessories in a manner that had a notable influence on Velázquez's style regarding those objects. From Mor, Coello learned precision in representation, and from Titian he incorporated Venetian gold tones, generous workmanship, and the use of light on a canvas. While his debt to Mor is evident, Coello brought distinctive qualities to the court portrait, notably a sharp sense of colour, a crispness of execution and a heightened realism. Coello's reputation as a portraitist has been diluted by the innumerable copies and imitations that wrongly bear his name. In the absence of a biographical study of Coello, many of his works are still confused with those of Sofonisba Anguissola, who painted royal portraits in the same period, and Juan Pantoja de la Cruz, Coello's pupil.

The religious works, many of which were created for El Escorial, are considered good but undistinguished examples of the more conventional austere style. Among his religious paintings is the St. Sebastian in the church of San Geronimo, also in Madrid.  Also attributed to the artist is a topographical view of the busy port of Sevilla (Museum of the Americas, Madrid).

Gallery

References

External links

1530s births
1588 deaths
People from Camp de Morvedre
Spanish people of Portuguese descent
Painters from the Valencian Community
16th-century Spanish painters
Spanish male painters